Alvorada is a municipality in the state of Rio Grande do Sul, in the south of Brazil, adjacent to the capital of the state, Porto Alegre. The city is also known as "The Capital of Solidarity." Alvorada is primarily a bedroom community with most workers commuting to adjacent cities such as Porto Alegre to work. Its name means "the awakening" or "the sunrise".

Although improvements have been made, the city suffers from heavy crime and squatting. The largest of these slums or favelas is the dangerous Umbu subdivision. Drug and arms trafficking are punctuated by periodic violence.

Geography
Alvorada is bordered by the municipalities of Porto Alegre by west, Viamão by south, Gravataí by east and Cachoeirinha by north.

The municipality's growth has occurred from Avenida Presidente Getúlio Vargas (President Getúlio Vargas Avenue), the main central thoroughfare of the city.

The municipality's economy is based mainly on commerce and industry. However, Alvorada is considered a commuter town, since most of Alvorada population works in the municipality of Porto Alegre.

References

External links
Photos of Alvorada
Alvorada City Hall (in Portuguese)

Municipalities in Rio Grande do Sul
Populated places established in 1965
Squatting in Brazil